Yaar Anmulle Returns is an Indian Punjabi-language comedy drama film directed by Harry Bhatti and produced by Amandeep Sihag, Adamya Singh, Amandeep Singh, Mithu Jhajhra, Dr. Varun Malik and Pankaj Dhaka. The film bank rolled by Shree Filmz and Jarnail Ghumaan in association with Batra Show Biz and They See Records, stars Harish Verma, Yuvraj Hans and Prabh Gill. This is the third film in the series after Yaar Annmulle and Yaar Annmulle 2.

The principal photography began on 3 October 2019. The film was scheduled to release on 27 March 2020 but was postponed due to the COVID-19 pandemic. The film  was released on 10 September 2021.

Cast
 Harish Verma
 Yuvraj Hans
 Prabh Gill
 Navpreet Banga 
 Nikeet Dhillon 
 Jesleen Slaich 
 Rana Jung Bahadur 
 Sukhwinder Chahal 
 Rahul Jungral
 Sanjveez Attri
 Manjit Singh 
 Prabh Kaur

Soundtrack

Soundtrack of the film was composed by Gurmeet Singh, Pargat Ghumaan and The Kidd whereas lyrics were penned by Happy Raikoti, Raas , Sarab Ghumaan and Raj Ranjodh. The songs are sung by Singga, Himmat Sandhu, Mannat Noor, Ninja, Prabh Gill, Yuvraaj Hans, Kamal Khan, Raj Ranjodh and Vikas.

References

External links
 

Punjabi-language Indian films
2020s Punjabi-language films
Indian comedy-drama films
2021 films
Indian sequel films
Films postponed due to the COVID-19 pandemic
2021 comedy-drama films